Yenkhor (Yonhor) is a rural locality (a selo) and the administrative centre of Yonkhorskoye Rural Settlement, Dzhidinsky District, Republic of Buryatia, Russia. The population was 797 as of 2013. There are 11 streets.

Geography 
Yenkhor is located 56 km southeast of Petropavlovka (the district's administrative centre) by road. Nyuguy is the nearest rural locality.

References 

Rural localities in Dzhidinsky District